Club 3 Degrees, sometimes shortened to Club 3, is a Christian nightclub located in the warehouse district of Minneapolis, Minnesota.  It is believed to be the largest Christian nightclub in the United States today.  Club 3 Degrees is a branch of 3 Degrees Ministries.

History

3 Degrees Ministries, the club's parent company, was founded in 1989 under the name "The New Union."  Club 3 Degrees formed at the same time.  The club stayed at its second location, after moving from the Old Union Bar and Grille, until 2003.  At that point, the ministry, along with Club 3 and 3 Degrees Church, moved to the warehouse district of Minneapolis where it remained for 8 years.  The move to the warehouse district attracted attention from major magazines such as Newsweek and Rolling Stone.

In 2011, 3 Degrees moved across the street from its long-time location and became a mobile ministry.

Concerts and shows

Club 3 Degrees has hosted prominent artists in the Christian music industry, such as Project 86, Family Force 5, Children 18:3, TobyMac, Kirk Franklin, Aiming For Aurora, Philmont, Brian "Head" Welch, Lecrae, and others.

Music tournament

Club 3 Degrees is best known for its nationally recognized music tournament, which has been judged by notable members of the music industry, such as the vice president of Tooth & Nail Records.  The tournament is held in rounds and winners in past years, such as Hyland and Philmont, have gone professional, signing record deals with Tooth & Nail Records and ForeFront Records, respectively.

References
All dates are MM-DD-YYYY at UTC

External links
3 Degrees Ministries
3 Degrees Church
Tooth & Nail Records

Culture of Minneapolis